In Poland, public roads are classified into two kinds of road hierarchies: road classes (according to technical and functional parameters) and road categories (according to the function in the road network).

Classes
The March 2, 1999 Decree of the Ministry of Transport and Maritime Economy (now Ministry of Infrastructure)  on technical conditions and operational requirements for public roads, introduced the following road classes and their hierarchy, starting from the road type with the highest parameters: 
motorway (marked with the symbol A)
expressway(marked with the symbol S), a limited-access road
 or class GP road, informally: droga szybkiego ruchu, "fast traffic road"  (marked with the symbol GP)
 (marked with the symbol G)
collector road (marked with the symbol Z)
local road (marked with the symbol L)
local access road (denoted by the symbol D)

Categories
The classification of roads into categories according to their functions was introduced by the March 21, 1985 act "On Public Roads" of the Sejm. The allowable road classes for particular categories were specified in the March 2, 1999 Decree.

National roads - classes A, S, GP
Voivodeship roads - classes GP or G
Powiat roads (:pl:Droga powiatowa) - classes GP, G, Z
Gmina roads (:pl:Droga gminna) - classes GP, G, Z, L, D

See also
Roads and expressways in Poland

References

 C